Alexandra "Alex" Hoffman (born November 10, 1987) is a beauty queen and athlete from Eureka, South Dakota, who competed in the Miss Teen USA pageant and placed in the Top 15 at Miss America 2009.

Biography

Pageants
Hoffman won her first state pageant title in late 2006 when she was crowned Miss South Dakota Teen USA 2006, having placed in the semi-finals in pageant the year before.  She later represented South Dakota in the Miss Teen USA 2006 pageant held in Palm Springs, California on August 11, 2006, but did not place.  In the 2007 pageant, when she passed on her title to Kari Schull of Watertown, her sister Elizabeth placed second runner-up.  Elizabeth won the Miss South Dakota Teen USA 2008 title the following year, making the Hoffmans the second sister pairing in four years to win the Miss South Dakota Teen USA title.

One week after her sister won Miss South Dakota Teen USA, Hoffman was crowned Miss SDSU, a local preliminary title for Miss South Dakota.  She competed in the Miss South Dakota pageant in early June 2008, winning a swimsuit preliminary on 5 June, the talent preliminary award for her vocal performance on 6 June and the title on 8 June. She is the first Miss South Dakota Teen USA to win a Miss America state title, and the first of the Miss Teen USA 2006 delegates to win a second major pageant title.  She and her sister reigned concurrently for five months.  Her second runner-up was Alexis LeVan, who reigned as Miss South Dakota USA when Hoffman was Miss South Dakota Teen USA in 2006.  Hoffman competed in the Miss America 2009 pageant in January 2009 where she made the top 15.

Personal life
Hoffman graduated from Eureka High School in Eureka, SD, in 2006 and was a student at South Dakota State University, where she holds a number of competitive swimming records.  Her father Charles Hoffman was a member of South Dakota House of Representatives representing the 23rd district from 2009 to 2015, and her mother Holly Hoffman was a contestant on Survivor: Nicaragua. Hoffman is currently a traffic reporter for KETV in Omaha, Nebraska.

References

External links 

Alex Hoffman on Facebook
 
KETV's Alex Hoffman

1987 births
Living people
2006 beauty pageant contestants
21st-century Miss Teen USA delegates
Miss America 2009 delegates
People from Eureka, South Dakota
American beauty pageant winners
American female swimmers
South Dakota State University alumni